Əzgilli or Ezgilly or Azgilli or Azgilo or Ezgilli may refer to:
Əzgilli, Goygol, Azerbaijan
Əzgilli, Zaqatala, Azerbaijan